The Indiana Intercollegiate Conference (IIC) was a college athletic conference in the United States from 1922 to 1950. It consisted of schools in Indiana.

The charter members of the conference were Indiana State University, Butler University, DePauw University, Earlham College, Franklin, Hanover College and Rose-Hulman.

The following year, University of Indianapolis and Ball State University joined. By the late 1940s, virtually every Indiana college; private or public was a member. The notable exceptions were Purdue University, Indiana University and the University of Notre Dame;
it was at this time that the Conference splintered into two, the Indiana Collegiate Conference made up of the larger schools and the Hoosier College Conference, comprising the smaller schools. The Hoosier College Conference evolved into Indiana Collegiate Athletic Conference—now known as the Heartland Collegiate Athletic Conference—in 1987.

History

Early years
The IIC was formed in July 1922; largely through the work of three officers, the athletic directors at Indiana State (Birch Bayh), Purdue (Nelson A. Kellogg) and DePauw (William M. Blanchard).

The IIC had many legendary players and coaches over the years. In basketball, John Wooden, Arad McCutchan, Tony Hinkle, and John Longfellow, all served as head coaches in the conference. Some notable IIC players included Duane Klueh, and Dick Atha.

Football was a conference sanctioned sport from 1934 to 1947 with the Butler Bulldogs dominating the conference by winning league titles from 1934 to 1940, as well as in 1946 and 1947.

The Indiana State Sycamores were the class of IIC baseball, winning titles in 1923, 1924, 1930, 1946, 1947, 1949 under Birch Bayh, Walter E. Marks and Paul Wolf.

Final years
The late 1940s and early 1950s saw many of the conference's athletic programs depart for other conferences, however many of the league's larger college programs became part of the Indiana Collegiate Conference which existed until 1978. The smaller schools formed the Hoosier College Conference, which evolved into the Indiana Collegiate Athletic Conference in 1987 and eventually the Heartland Collegiate Athletic Conference.

Members

Membership timeline

Subsequent conference affiliations

Conference champions

Men's basketball

Indiana State won men's basketball titles in 1947, 1948, 1949 and 1950. In 1948, Indiana State was the Runner-Up in the NAIA National title game. In 1950, Indiana State won the NAIA National Title. DePauw won the conference title in the early 1930s; Central Normal won consecutive titles in 1935-36 & 1936-37.

Notable personalities in the history of the league include; John Wooden, Cal Luther, Lee Hamilton, Tubby Moffett and Arad McCutchan.

Baseball
Indiana State won titles in 1923, 1924, 1930, 1946, 1947, 1949.

Football
Butler was the league powerhouse, winning titles in 1934, 1935, 1936, 1937, 1938, 1939, 1946 and 1947; they shared the title with Manchester University in 1940.

No conference championship was awarded in 1943 and 1944 due to World War II.

Tennis
DePauw's men's tennis team of 1937 and 1941 won the conference title while going undefeated both seasons; 8-0 in 1937 and 14-0 in 1941. The 1941 edition swept the conference while also defeating several Big Ten and SEC opponents

See also
List of defunct college football conferences

Further reading

References

 
Sports organizations established in 1922
Organizations disestablished in 1950
1922 establishments in Indiana
1950 disestablishments in Indiana